Gymnanthemum  is a genus of Asian, African and South American plants in the Vernonieae within the daisy family.

 Species

 formerly included
numerous species now regarded as members of other genera: Acilepis Decaneuropsis Eremosis Kinghamia Monosis Phyllocephalum Strobocalyx Vernonia

References

External links
 

 
Asteraceae genera